Mints designed for the manufacturing of coins have been commonplace since coined currency was first development around 600 BC by the Lydian people of modern-day Turkey. The popularity of coins spread across the Mediterranean so that by 6th-century BC nearby regions of Athens, Aegina, Corinth and Persia had all developed their own coins.

Methods used at mints to produce coins have changed as technology has developed, with early coins either being cast using moulds to produce cast coins or struck between two dies to produce hammered coin. Around the middle of the 16th century machine-made milled coins were developed allowing coins of a higher quality to be made.

National currencies are generally minted by a country's central bank or on its behalf by an independent mint. For example, the coins of the New Zealand Dollar are minted jointly by the Royal Mint in the United Kingdom and the Royal Canadian Mint for the Reserve Bank of New Zealand. Also national mints are sometimes privatised to become state-owned enterprises allowing them to pursue commercial interests such as producing commemorative coins, medals and different types of bullion.

Today the United States Mint is largest mint manufacturer in the world, operating across six sites and producing as many as 28 billion coins in a single year. Its largest site is the Philadelphia Mint which covers  650,000 square feet and can produce 32 million coins per day.

The world's oldest continuously running mint is the Monnaie de Paris in France which was founded in AD 864 and is the world's 8th oldest company. The second is the British Royal Mint, founded in AD 886 and the 10th oldest.

Historic and defunct mints

References

External links
 Mints of the World
 World Mints

Mints (currency)
Mints, List of